This Thing of Ours is the debut album from British recording artist Rainy Milo. The album was recorded in the San Francisco Bay area in 2013 with the help of producer, mixer, engineer, and songwriter Daje. The album comes in both standard and deluxe formats, and features Milo's singles "'Deal Me Briefly", "Rats" and "'Bout You".

Producers for the album include Daje, Caswell, Chet Faker, Cole M. Greif-Neill, BLCK-RSSN and Flowzart. The record was originally released in the UK by Milo's label Limey/ Virgin EMI on 3 March 2014. The record was later released in the US and worldwide by Limey/Big Picnic on 21 April 2015. In addition to the new album art, the Clash cover track, "Bankrobber", features Kossisko on the 2015 release.

Background

Milo started singing with local musicians and art collectives when she was fourteen. During Milo's childhood she tried to surround herself with inspiring people.
Milo began surfing the internet for jazz-inspired hip-hop beats she could sing over, whilst surfing the internet she came across a bead by producer BLCK RSSN. Milo recorded over the beat and the track became her debut recording entitled "'Bout You", the song caught the attention of Gilles Peterson for his Brownswood Bubblers compilation series. Milo received various offers from record labels but turned them down as she felt it was too early. Milo began working on first mixtape entitled Limey, produced by Cole MGN. Milo released her mixtape in October 2012 which gained large amounts of acclaim from critics who called the mixtape a "perfect soundtrack" and praising its "chilly atmospherics and lyrics." Critics also praised Milo's vocals noting them as "startling" and "smoking".
In March 2013 a signed recording contract with Mercury and Universal and began working on her debut EP.

Critical reception
Upon release the album received universal acclaim from music critics, Robert Copsey of Digital Spy praised Milo's "effortless blend of R&B, jazz, hip-hop and pop", continuing to note comparisons between her work and the work of Amy Winehouse, Neneh Cherry and Corinne Bailey Rae.

Track listing

Bonus tracks

Credits
 Vocals recorded by Flowzart on "'Bout You"
 Mastered by Pete Lyman at Infrasonic Sound in Los Angeles
 Additional Engineering and Programming by Jeff Matej
 Percussion by James Henry on "Bankrobber"
 Male Vocals by Khi Graham on "Rats" and "Below My Reach"

References

External links

2014 albums
Rainy Milo albums